Brian Fenton (born 2 March 1994) is a Gaelic footballer who plays for the Raheny club and for the Dublin county team. He was the 2018 and 2020 All Stars Footballer of the Year.

Education and family
His father (Brian senior), is from Spa, outside Killarney. The family home is in Raheny. Initially training as a physiotherapist, Fenton studied for a Masters in Business Management so that he could embark on a new career selling hospital and clinic equipment as a medical sales representative with Tekno Surgical. He bought his own house in Killester. After the five-in-row, Fenton went on holiday to Marbella with his girlfriend for a few days.

Playing career

Inter-county
Fenton was a member of the Dublin team that won an All-Ireland Under-21 Football Championship in 2014.
	
In 2015 Fenton made his senior debut, starting a national league game against Monaghan where he quickly scored a goal in a strong win. He won the National Football League and the Leinster Senior Football Championship with Dublin, starting both games in midfield.

Fenton was named as the Man of the Match in the 2015 All-Ireland Final, as Dublin defeated Kerry on a 0-12 to 0-9 scoreline.

Fenton won the League title with Dublin in 2016 against Kerry in the final, scoring a point in the game. He was a key performer in Dublin retaining the Sam Maguire cup in 2016 which Dublin won after defeating Mayo by a single point after a replay. He won his second All Star award in as many seasons and named on the shortlist for Footballer of the Year, which was ultimately won by Mayo's Lee Keegan.

In 2017 Fenton was part of the Dublin team defeated in the National League final by Kerry, losing on a scoreline of 0-20 to 1-16. Despite this, he was crucial in Dublin retaining their Leinster title while beating a record held since the 70's by winning 7 championships in a row. Dublin retained their All Ireland title defeating Mayo in the final again by a single point after Dean Rock kicked a match winning free kick late in injury time. Fenton also scored a point to help Dublin over the line on a scoreline of 1-17 to 1-16.

Fenton continued his success with Dublin in 2018, winning the National Football League, the Leinster and All-Ireland Championships. He was awarded an All Star and named the Footballer of the Year for his performances.

On 14 September 2019, Fenton was a key player in Dublin's conquerage of Kerry to win the elusive five Sam Maguires in a row, which had never been done by any team before, though some teams came close with the four-in-a-row, including Kerry (twice).

During Dublin's five-in-a-row, Fenton spent more time on the field of play than any other Dublin player, starting 35 of the 37 matches in the championship.

Fenton played every minute of Dublin's historic six All Ireland's in a row campaign.

Reception
Colm O'Rourke has described Fenton as "one of the best midfielders ever".

Career Statistics 

 As of match played 10 July 2022

Honours

 Dublin
 All-Ireland Senior Football Championship (6): 2015, 2016, 2017, 2018, 2019, 2020 
 Leinster Senior Football Championship (8): 2015, 2016, 2017, 2018, 2019, 2020, 2021, 2022 
 National Football League (4): 2015, 2016, 2018, 2021 (Shared)
 All-Ireland Under-21 Football Championship (1): 2014 
 Leinster Under-21 Football Championship (1): 2014

Individual

 GAA-GPA All Stars Awards (5): 2015, 2016, 2018, 2019, 2020
 All Stars Footballer of the Year (2): 2018, 2020
 All-Ireland Senior Football Championship Final Man of the Match (1): 2015
 In May 2020, a public poll conducted by RTÉ.ie named Fenton at midfield alongside Jack O'Shea in a team of footballers who had won All Stars during the era of The Sunday Game.

References

External links
'Brian Fenton the complete package': Peter Canavan analyses Dublin's midfielder

1993 births
Living people
All Stars Footballers of the Year
Dublin inter-county Gaelic footballers
Irish physiotherapists
Irish salespeople
Raheny GAA footballers
Sportspeople from Dublin (city)
Winners of six All-Ireland medals (Gaelic football)
People educated at St. Fintan's High School